Hartshorn is an unincorporated community in Danville Township, Vermilion County, Illinois.

Geography

References

Unincorporated communities in Vermilion County, Illinois
Unincorporated communities in Illinois